Aaghaaz (Translated: Beginning) is a 2000 Hindi-language action thriller film directed by Yogesh Ishwar. It is the remake of a Telugu movie Sivayya, which was also produced by D. Suresh Babu.

Plot summary
Govind Narang (Sunil Shetty) is an honest and chivalrous man from a small village in Punjab. He falls in love with Sudha (Sushmita Sen), but marries his mentor's daughter, Pushpa (Suman Ranganathan), to save her from public ridicule. Pushpa was impregnated by a police officer who refuses to marry her. She does not love Govind and hates Sudha with a passion. Together with her brother, Laxman (Sharad Kapoor), Pushpa tries to expel Sudha from the village, but is unsuccessful. When Laxman finds out about Pushpa's infidelity, he poisons her. After his wife's death, Govind relocates to Mumbai with his sister, Ratna (Shraddha Nigam). He meets beautiful Gitika (Namrata Shirodkar), and they fall in love. One day, as Govind defends the honor of a young girl from the brother of a hoodlum, Johnny Handsome (Sharat Saxena), he generates hatred and animosity. Johnny is humiliated by Govind and swears vengeance with the help of Sadanand Kutty (Gulshan Grover) and Karim Khan Toofani (Govind Namdeo).
On the other hand, Govind befriends Ram Sevak (Alok Nath), and with his help and assistance of a landowner, he arranges the purchase of a large plot of land so that hawkers and small shop-owners could set up their businesses. But nothing goes according to plan. The plot of land and the owner turn out to be fake, Ram Sevak turns out to be a member of the gangsters, and Govind gets all the blame. His sister is openly raped, and Govind himself gets seriously wounded in broad daylight before the very eyes of the people he defended. Govind is then helped by Sudha, and he decides to exact revenge. He files an FIR against everyone in the neighbourhood who witnessed what happened to his sister, except the culprits themselves. When they are brought to court, he condemns everyone for their attitude, and then tells them to be brave and fight the criminals. Encouraged by this, the entire neighbourhood decides to take on the gang. They attack the gangsters with bottles when they come to threaten them in the locality, and then move on to Johnny Handsome's office, breaking everything and attacking all the goons. They join Govind and Sudha to attack the gangsters and arrest them. The criminals are sentenced to death, and everything returns to normal. In the end, though, on a happy note, Govind's sister marries a close friend of the family, Harish (Akshay Anand), and Govind agrees to marry Sudha.

Cast
Suniel Shetty as Govind Narang, Ratna's brother and Pushpa's husband.
Namrata Shirodkar as Gitika
Sushmita Sen as Inspector Sudha
Suman Ranganathan as Pushpa, Laxman's sister and Govind's wife.
Shraddha Nigam as Ratna Narang, Govind's sister.
Akshay Anand as Harish Patil
Sharat Saxena as Johnny Handsome Mendoza, the main antagonist.
Asrani as Gullu, Gay.
Rakesh Bedi as Dilip Roy
Sudhir Dalvi as Pushpa's father 
Gulshan Grover as Sadanand Kutty
Sharad Kapoor as Laxman, Pushpa's brother and Govind's brother-in-law.
Anupam Kher as Balraj Nanda
Viju Khote as Deshpande
Johnny Lever as Rajni Deva                                                                                                                          
Govind Namdeo as Karim Khan Toofani
Alok Nath as Ram Charan Shukla
Yunus Parvez as Dheerajlal
Achyut Potdar as The Judge
Rajesh Puri as Professor Pillai
Shiva Rindani as Suku
Asha Sachdev as a Woman Summoned at Court.
Anjan Srivastav as The Ordinary Man
Mukesh Tiwari as Danny Mendoza, Johnny's younger brother.
Manoj Joshi as The assistant of Danny Mendoza, Johnny's younger brother.  
Padmini Kapila as Mrs. Balraj Nanda

Soundtrack

References

External links
 

2000 films
2000s Hindi-language films
2000s crime action films
2000 crime drama films
Indian gangster films
2000s masala films
Films about rape in India
Indian crime action films
Films about organised crime in India
Films scored by Anu Malik
Hindi remakes of Telugu films
Hindi-language action films
Indian crime drama films
Suresh Productions films